Acanthocephala thomasi, the giant agave bug, is a species of leaf-footed bug in the family Coreidae. It is found in Central America and North America.

References

Further reading

External links

 

Articles created by Qbugbot
Insects described in 1872
thomasi